Traffic is the title of a group exhibition of contemporary art that took place at CAPC musée d'art contemporain de Bordeaux, France, through February and March, 1996.

Theme

The exhibition was curated by Nicolas Bourriaud in order to showcase the tendency that he identified as Relational Aesthetics or Relational Art.

Critical reaction

Writing in Zing art magazine, Emily Tsingou said, "For a brief moment, and on a theoretical level, the show attempted an interesting claim. The idea, though, of interactivity is not a very lucid one, especially if one considers that it could be stretched to such extent as to encompass any art work and the presence of a viewer (even in its traditional sense, art functions on that quality) ... overall the show bore the characteristics of a traffic jam: at a standstill and agitated."

Writing in Frieze art magazine, Carl Freedman said, "Traffic and Bourriaud’s concept of ‘relationality’ were just too unspecific to be capable of defining a new art, especially when so many of the works did little to support the exhibition’s premise. This was an ambitiously funded exhibition which was only able to provide the viewer with a largely familiar array of objects and images. With the primary beneficiaries of ‘Traffic’ tending to be the participating artists and their associates, Bourriaud may need to look at what actually constitutes the socio-political determinants of his ‘interhuman space’.

Artists exhibited

 Vanessa Beecroft
 Henry Bond
 Jes Brinch and Henrik Plenge Jakobsen
 Angela Bulloch
 Maurizio Cattelan
 Andrea Clavadetscher and Eric Schumacher
 Honoré d'O
 Liam Gillick
 Dominique Gonzalez-Foerster
 Douglas Gordon
 Jens Haaning
 Lothar Hempel
 Christine Hill
 Noritoshi Hirakawa
 Carsten Höller
 Pierre Huyghe
 Peter Land
 Miltos Manetas
 Gabriel Orozco
 Jorge Pardo
 Philippe Parreno
 Jason Rhoades
 Christopher Sperandio and Simon Grennan
 Rirkrit Tiravanija
 Xavier Veilhan
 Gillian Wearing
 Kenji Yanobe

References

Art exhibitions in France
1996 in art